Saskia Pronk (born 6 August 1983) is a Dutch wheelchair basketball player (1.0 disability class) and a member of the Netherlands women's national wheelchair basketball team. She plays as a forward. With the national team she won the gold medal at the 2020 Summer Paralympics, and the bronze medal at the 2012 Summer Paralympics. 

She also became world champion in 2018 and European champion in 2017 and 2019.

Life 
Pronk was born in Den Helder on 6 August 1983. Due to a failed surgery in 2005 she has a paraplegia. She started playing with wheelchair basketball in 2007 after being invited by the coach of club JBC in Julianadorp. She made her debut for the Dutch national team in 2010.

References

1983 births
Living people
Dutch women's wheelchair basketball players
Paralympic wheelchair basketball players of the Netherlands
Paralympic gold medalists for the Netherlands
Paralympic bronze medalists for the Netherlands
Paralympic medalists in wheelchair basketball
Medalists at the 2012 Summer Paralympics
Medalists at the 2020 Summer Paralympics
Wheelchair basketball players at the 2012 Summer Paralympics
Wheelchair basketball players at the 2020 Summer Paralympics
People from Den Helder
21st-century Dutch women